Bonifacius or Bonifatius is the given name of:

 Bonifatius (died 432), ancient Roman general and governor of the Diocese of Africa
 Bonifacius of S. Marco (died 1130 or later), Roman Catholic cardinal priest
 Bonifaciu Florescu (1848–1899), Romanian author and politician born Bonifacius Florescu
 Bonifatius Haushiku (1932–2002), Namibian Roman Catholic bishop and archbishop
 Bonifacius Cornelis de Jonge (1875–1958), Dutch politician and Governor-General of the Dutch East Indies

See also
 Boniface (name)

Masculine given names